Craig William Hartsburg (born June 29, 1959) is a Canadian former professional ice hockey player and head coach, who currently serves as an amateur scout and defense development coach with the Columbus Blue Jackets of the National Hockey League (NHL). Hartsburg played ten seasons with the Minnesota North Stars of the NHL as a defenceman from 1979 until 1989, captaining the team for seven NHL seasons before pursuing a coaching career. He featured in the 1981 Stanley Cup Finals with the North Stars.

Hartsburg has coached in the Ontario Hockey League, the Western Hockey League, and has previously been an NHL head coach with the Chicago Blackhawks, Mighty Ducks of Anaheim and Ottawa Senators.

Playing career
Hartsburg played three seasons of junior hockey for the Sault Ste. Marie Greyhounds, where he was a teammate of Wayne Gretzky's during the 1977–78 season. In Hartsburg's last two seasons with the Greyhounds, he averaged over a point per game. In 1977–78, Hartsburg represented Canada at the World Junior Championships, scoring five points in six games.

Hartsburg skipped his fourth and final junior season, deciding instead to turn pro with the Birmingham Bulls of the World Hockey Association (WHA) in June 1978, as an underage free agent. Hartsburg amassed nine goals and 40 assists in his rookie professional season. With the collapse of the financially troubled WHA in 1979, Hartsburg was drafted sixth overall by the Minnesota North Stars in the 1979 NHL Entry Draft.

Hartsburg played 570 NHL games, over ten seasons. He scored 98 goals and 315 assists, for 413 points. In 1981–82, his best offensive season, Hartsburg recorded 17 goals and 60 assists for 77 points, with a +11 plus-minus rating. He also finished fourth in Norris Trophy voting. Internationally, he represented Canada at the 1981 and 1987 Canada Cups.  At the 1987 IIHF World Championships he was named the tournament's top defenceman. He played in the NHL All-Star game in 1980, 1982, and 1983.  Hartsburg's seven seasons as North Stars' captain remained the franchise record for seasons of captaincy until Derian Hatcher broke the record at the end of the 2002-03 NHL season, after the team's move to Dallas.

Coaching career
Following two injury-riddled seasons in which Hartsburg missed 103 of a possible 160 games because of hip problems, Hartsburg retired as a player at age 30 and accepted an assistant coaching position with the North Stars for the 1989–90 season. He then became an assistant coach with the Philadelphia Flyers from 1990 to 1994. He then served as head coach of the Guelph Storm of the Ontario Hockey League (OHL) for the 1994–95 season, before returning to the NHL as the head coach from 1995 to 1998 of the Chicago Blackhawks. In 1998, he was named head coach of the Mighty Ducks of Anaheim before being replaced in midseason of 2000–01.

He coached junior hockey with the Sault Ste. Marie Greyhounds of the OHL for one season, before rejoining the Flyers as an assistant for two seasons. In 2004, he returned to the Greyhounds and served as the head coach until 2008. He also served as coach for the Canadian World Junior Team. He received a gold medal in the 2007 World Junior Ice Hockey Championships, when Team Canada beat Russia 4–2.  He was also the coach for Team Canada in the 2008 World Junior Ice Hockey Championships when Canada again won gold by beating Sweden 3–2 in overtime.

On June 13, 2008, he signed a three-year contract and was named head coach of the Ottawa Senators, replacing general manager Bryan Murray who had assumed interim coaching duties when John Paddock was fired on February 27, 2008. On February 1, 2009, Hartsburg was fired by the Senators, having compiled a 17–24–7 record during the 2008–09 season.

On June 23, 2009, the Everett Silvertips of the Western Hockey League named Hartsburg its third head coach in franchise history. On June 6, 2011, Hartsburg stepped down from his coaching job in Everett to join the Calgary Flames as an assistant coach.  On June 7, 2012, Craig Hartsburg was released by the Calgary Flames, but was named associate coach of the Columbus Blue Jackets only 13 days later. His coaching time with the Blue Jackets came to an end on April 13, 2016 when his retirement was announced. On July 12, 2019, he returned to the Blue Jackets as an amateur scout and defense development coach.

Personal
Hartsburg and his wife, Peggy, have two children. Their son, Chris, is the head coach of the OHL's  Erie Otters, while their daughter Katie, is a speech pathologist. He has 3 grandchildren: Colin, Blake and Greyson. Hartsburg lists Gretzky as the best player he has played with, and Chris Chelios as the best player he has coached. Hartsburg's favorite hobby is fishing.

Career statistics

Regular season and playoffs

International

Coaching record

NHL

Junior hockey

References

External links

1959 births
Living people
Anaheim Ducks coaches
Birmingham Bulls players
Calgary Flames coaches
Canadian ice hockey coaches
Canadian ice hockey defencemen
Chicago Blackhawks coaches
Columbus Blue Jackets coaches
Columbus Blue Jackets scouts
Everett Silvertips coaches
Guelph Storm coaches
Ice hockey people from Ontario
Minnesota North Stars coaches
Minnesota North Stars draft picks
Minnesota North Stars players
National Hockey League All-Stars
National Hockey League first-round draft picks
Ottawa Senators coaches
Philadelphia Flyers coaches
Sault Ste. Marie Greyhounds players
Sault Ste. Marie Greyhounds coaches
Sportspeople from Stratford, Ontario